The Open Skies Treaty between Hungary and Romania was a bilateral agreement between Hungary and Romania in force from 1992 to 2001. The Treaty became effective on 27 February 1992 and consisted of agreed-upon surveillance overflights between the two countries to assess the strength and disposition of opposing military forces. It was the first such "Open Skies" Agreement and a precursor to the Treaty on Open Skies that entered into force between NATO members and members of the former Warsaw Pact on 1 January 2002, to which Hungary and Romania are both signatories. A demonstration flight was carried out in June 1991.

The main motivation for the Treaty was to demonstrate stable relations between the two countries after violent clashes between almost 20,000 ethnic Romanians and Hungarians  at Târgu Mureș in March 1990. The clashes were about Transylvania, a region controlled by Romania since 1947 that had gone back and forth between the two countries several times, and which is home to a substantial Hungarian minority.

See also
Hungary–Romania relations
Multilateral Treaty on Open Skies  that entered into force in 2002

References

External links
Treaty text 
Treaty text (in English), UN document A/46/188, S/22638, 24 May 1991. Treaty text (in Arabic), Treaty text (in Chinese), Treaty text (in French), Treaty text (in Russian), Treaty text (in Spanish)

Bilateral treaties
Treaties of Romania
Treaties of Hungary
Hungary–Romania relations
Treaties concluded in 1991